Langloan railway station served the suburb of Langloan, North Lanarkshire, Scotland from 1866 from 1964 on the Rutherglen and Coatbridge Railway.

History 
The station opened on 8 January 1866 by the Caledonian Railway. To the west was the Langloan Weights signal box and to the north was the goods yard. The station closed on 5 October 1964.

References

External links 

Disused railway stations in North Lanarkshire
Railway stations in Great Britain opened in 1866
Railway stations in Great Britain closed in 1964
Beeching closures in Scotland
Former Caledonian Railway stations
1866 establishments in Scotland
1964 disestablishments in Scotland
Coatbridge